The Pierre Rossiter and Charlotte Hines House is a house located in Portland, Oregon listed on the National Register of Historic Places. Constructed in 1927, the house illustrates Colonial Revival architecture.

References

1927 establishments in Oregon
Colonial Revival architecture in Oregon
Houses completed in 1927
Houses on the National Register of Historic Places in Portland, Oregon
Portland Historic Landmarks